Events in the year 1977 in Japan.  It corresponds to Shōwa 52 (昭和52年) in the Japanese calendar.

Incumbents 
Emperor: Hirohito
Prime minister: Takeo Fukuda (Liberal Democratic)
Chief Cabinet Secretary: Sunao Sonoda until November 28, Shintaro Abe
Chief Justice of the Supreme Court: Ekizo Fujibayashi until August 25,  Masao Okahara from August 26
President of the House of Representatives: Shigeru Hori
President of the House of Councillors: Kenzō Kōno until July 3, Ken Yasui from July 28
Diet sessions: 80th (regular session opened on December 30, 1976, to June 9), 81st (extraordinary, July 27 to August 3), 82nd (extraordinary, September 29 to November 25), 83rd (extraordinary, December 7 to December 10), 84th (regular, December 19 to June 16, 1978)

Governors
Aichi Prefecture: Yoshiaki Nakaya 
Akita Prefecture: Yūjirō Obata 
Aomori Prefecture: Shunkichi Takeuchi 
Chiba Prefecture: Kiichi Kawakami 
Ehime Prefecture: Haruki Shiraishi 
Fukui Prefecture: Heidayū Nakagawa 
Fukuoka Prefecture: Hikaru Kamei 
Fukushima Prefecture: Isao Matsudaira 
Gifu Prefecture: vacant (until 8 February); Yosuke Uematsu (starting 8 February)
Gunma Prefecture: Ichiro Shimizu 
Hiroshima Prefecture: Hiroshi Miyazawa 
Hokkaido: Naohiro Dōgakinai 
Hyogo Prefecture: Tokitada Sakai
Ibaraki Prefecture: Fujio Takeuchi 
Ishikawa Prefecture: Yōichi Nakanishi 
Iwate Prefecture: Tadashi Chida 
Kagawa Prefecture: Tadao Maekawa 
Kagoshima Prefecture: Saburō Kanemaru (until 3 February); Kaname Kamada (starting 3 March)
Kanagawa Prefecture: Kazuji Nagasu 
Kochi Prefecture: Chikara Nakauchi  
Kumamoto Prefecture: Issei Sawada 
Kyoto Prefecture: Torazō Ninagawa 
Mie Prefecture: Ryōzō Tagawa 
Miyagi Prefecture: Sōichirō Yamamoto 
Miyazaki Prefecture: Hiroshi Kuroki 
Nagano Prefecture: Gon'ichirō Nishizawa 
Nagasaki Prefecture: Kan'ichi Kubo 
Nara Prefecture: Ryozo Okuda 
Niigata Prefecture: Takeo Kimi 
Oita Prefecture: Masaru Taki 
Okayama Prefecture: Shiro Nagano 
Okinawa Prefecture: Koichi Taira 
Osaka Prefecture: Ryōichi Kuroda 
Saga Prefecture: Sunao Ikeda 
Saitama Prefecture: Yawara Hata 
Shiga Prefecture: Masayoshi Takemura 
Shiname Prefecture: Seiji Tsunematsu 
Shizuoka Prefecture: Keizaburō Yamamoto 
Tochigi Prefecture: Yuzuru Funada 
Tokushima Prefecture: Yasunobu Takeichi 
Tokyo: Ryōkichi Minobe 
Tottori Prefecture: Kōzō Hirabayashi 
Toyama Prefecture: Kokichi Nakada 
Wakayama Prefecture: Shirō Kariya  
Yamagata Prefecture: Seiichirō Itagaki 
Yamaguchi Prefecture: Toru Hirai 
Yamanashi Prefecture: Kunio Tanabe

Events 
January to February – According to Japan Fire and Disaster Management Agency, a widely heavy snow and avalanche, affective winter storm hit around nationwide, resulting to official confirmed report, total 101 person were human fatalities and 834 persons were wounded.
January 4 - Poisoned cola is placed in a telephone booth near Shinagawa Station, killing two.
June 15 - Outbreak of cholera in Arida, Wakayama prefecture.
August 7 - Mount Usu erupts.
September 9 - Typhoon Babe strikes Okinoerabujima.
September 19 - Yutaka Kume is abducted by North Korean agents in Noto Peninsula - beginning of North Korean abductions of Japanese citizens.

Births 
January 3 - Mayumi Iizuka, voice actress
January 22 - Hidetoshi Nakata, footballer
January 30 – Takahiro Arai, former professional baseball player 
February 10 – Morihiro Hashimoto, darts player (d. 2017) 
March 15 - Norifumi Yamamoto, mixed martial artist
April 27 - Dai Fujikura, composer
May 8 - Chiaki Takahashi, voice actress
May 26 - Misaki Ito, actress
June 22 - Ryōko Ono, voice actress
June 25 - Naoya Tsukahara, gymnast
June 26 - Tite Kubo, manga artist, creator of BLEACH
August 13 - Miho Konishi, actress
August 22 - Miho Kanno, actress and singer
August 23 - Kenta Miyake, voice actor
August 25 - Masumi Asano, voice actress
August 30 - Sayori Ishizuka, voice actress
September 6 - Kiyoshi Hikawa, enka singer 
September 15 - Angela Aki, singer-songwriter
September 20 - Namie Amuro, singer
September 23 - Nozomi Momoi, Japanese AV idol, and murder victim (d. 2002)  
September 25 - Atsushi Aoki, Japanese professional wrestler (d. 2019) 
October 1 – Christel Takigawa, television presenter 
December 6 - Miwa Yasuda, voice actress

Deaths 
March 21 - Kinuyo Tanaka, actress (b. 1909)
March 31 - Yasuji Kamada, photographer (b. 1883)
December 19 - Takeo Kurita, admiral (b. 1889)

See also
 1977 in anime
 1977 in Japanese television
 List of Japanese films of 1977

References

 
Japan
Years of the 20th century in Japan